The Tomasee ( or ) is a lake at the northern face of Piz Badus, above the  village of Tschamut in Grisons, Switzerland.

It is the source of the Anterior Rhine and is deemed to be the official source of the Rhine (the source of the Posterior Rhine is above Hinterrhein, Switzerland, at ).

It is possible to reach the lake on a path from Oberalp Pass, suitable for most walkers although still a mountain trail.

Notes

External links

Lakes of Switzerland
Lakes of Graubünden
Tourist attractions in Switzerland
LTomasee
Tujetsch